Wang Yidi (born 14 February 1997) is a Chinese table tennis player.

In June 2019, she won the Hong Kong Open by beating Mima Ito 4–0 in the final.

In July 2019, she won four gold medals at the 2019 Summer Universiade.

Singles titles

References

External links

Table tennis players from Anshan
1997 births
Living people
Chinese female table tennis players
Universiade medalists in table tennis
Universiade gold medalists for China
East China University of Science and Technology alumni
Medalists at the 2019 Summer Universiade
World Table Tennis Championships medalists